Agustín García (born 6 April 1980) is an Argentine alpine skier. He competed in two events at the 2002 Winter Olympics.

References

1980 births
Living people
Argentine male alpine skiers
Olympic alpine skiers of Argentina
Alpine skiers at the 2002 Winter Olympics
Sportspeople from Bariloche